The 1980–81 Albanian National Championship was the 42nd season of the Albanian National Championship, the top professional league for association football clubs, since its establishment in 1930.

Overview
It was contested by 14 teams, and Partizani won the championship.

League table

Note: "17 Nëntori" is Tirana, "Labinoti" is Elbasani, "Lokomotiva Durrës" is Teuta and "Traktori" is Lushnja.

Results

Season statistics

Top scorers

References

Albania - List of final tables (RSSSF)

Kategoria Superiore seasons
1
Albania